is a Japanese citizen and trampoline gymnast, representing his nation at international competitions.

At the age of four Ito began to learn swimming and gymnastics, including artistic gymnastics and trampoline, but by the age of six, following the advice of his instructor, began to focus on the trampoline. He enjoyed the trampoline because it felt like flying.

Ito participated at the 2012 Summer Olympics in London. He competed at world championships, including at the 2007, 2009, 2010, 2011, 2013, 2014 and 2015 Trampoline World Championships. Ito was unable to train for six months in 2013 because of injuries to his wrist, and incurred a back injury in 2015.  He reached the final of the men's trampoline at the 2016 Olympics.

References

External links
 
 
 

1988 births
Living people
People from Nerima
Japanese male trampolinists
Olympic gymnasts of Japan
Gymnasts at the 2012 Summer Olympics
Gymnasts at the 2016 Summer Olympics
Gymnasts at the 2010 Asian Games
Gymnasts at the 2014 Asian Games
Medalists at the Trampoline Gymnastics World Championships
Asian Games competitors for Japan
Competitors at the 2009 World Games
World Games gold medalists